Cristian Jesús Broggi (born 26 March 1993) is an Argentine professional footballer who plays as a right-back for Deportivo Morón.

Club career
Broggi got his career underway with Deportivo Morón. He made one appearance in the 2014 Primera B Metropolitana, featuring for eighty-five minutes of a 1–0 defeat to Acassuso on 11 September. Seventy-eight games came for Broggi across four seasons, with the latter concluding with promotion to Primera B Nacional. He subsequently appeared nine times in the second tier, before Broggi departed on loan in July 2018 to Primera B Metropolitana's Barracas Central. His debut arrived on 2 September versus Justo José de Urquiza, which was followed by him scoring his first goal in December against All Boys in a 2–0 win.

International career
In 2016, Broggi appeared for the Argentina U23s in Kozhikode, India at the Sait Nagjee Trophy.

Career statistics
.

Honours
Deportivo Morón
Primera B Metropolitana: 2016–17

Barracas Central
Primera B Metropolitana: 2018–19

References

External links

1993 births
Living people
Sportspeople from Buenos Aires Province
Argentine footballers
Association football defenders
Primera B Metropolitana players
Primera Nacional players
Deportivo Morón footballers
Barracas Central players